Acrolophus corticinocolor is a moth of the family Acrolophidae. It is found in Costa Rica.

References

corticinocolor
Moths described in 1920